TSF is a Portuguese radio station, founded in 1989 and broadcasting from Lisbon.

TSF is one of the three main Portuguese radio news stations, alongside Antena 1 and Rádio Renascença. Its programs are focused on news. It was legally founded, though its first broadcast on 29 February 1988 was not legal, because at that time private radios were forbidden in Portugal. TSF is part of the Portuguese Global Media Group.

In February 2020, it had an audience share of 3.7% or 317,000 listeners

Programs 
The station's programs include political commentary, debate and sports. Programs are published on the station website and are also available on podcast platforms.

References

External links
 Official site

Former pirate radio stations
Radio stations in Portugal
Portuguese-language radio stations
Mass media in Lisbon
Radio stations established in 1989
1989 establishments in Portugal